Brageneset is an island at Nordaustlandet, Svalbard. It is located at the mouth of Wahlenbergfjorden. The ice cap Vestfonna has the glacier arm Bragebreen which debouches east of Brageneset, and another glacier arm, Gimlebreen debouches into Hinlopen Strait north of Brageneset.

Brageneset was believed to be a headland until the summer of 2019, when the ice cap retreated far enough to reveal that it is actually an island.

References

Islands of Svalbard